A list (incomplete) of volcanoes on Earth arranged by elevation in metres.

6,000 metres

5,000 metres

4,000 metres

3,000 metres

2,000 metres

1,000 metres

Below 1,000 metres

From its base on the ocean floor 

A list (incomplete) of volcanoes on Earth arranged by elevation in meters from its base on the ocean floor.

See also
List of mountains by elevation
Lists of volcanoes

References

Global Volcanism Program
 Elevation
Volcanoes